Richard Hübers (born 10 February 1993) is a German fencer. He competed in the men's team sabre event at the 2020 Summer Olympics.

References

External links
 

1993 births
Living people
German male fencers
Olympic fencers of Germany
Fencers at the 2020 Summer Olympics
People from Solingen
Sportspeople from Düsseldorf (region)
Fencers at the 2010 Summer Youth Olympics
Fencers at the 2015 European Games
European Games medalists in fencing
European Games bronze medalists for Germany
20th-century German people
21st-century German people